is a 15-minute Japanese educational television program that has been aired by NHK since April 9, 2002. A five-minute format called PythagoraSwitch Mini is also available.

"Pythagorean device" is the equivalent Japanese colloquialism for the American "Rube Goldberg machine" and British "Heath Robinson" contraption. The main focus of the program is a puppet show, but the subject is mainly advanced by small corners. World phenomena, principles, characteristics, and the like are introduced in an entertaining way. At the end of each segment, the show's title is sung as a kind of punchline.

Segments 
In the show, segments are called "corners".

Today's Topic 
A puppet show in which  explains the structure of the world to  young penguins Pita and Gora. A recurring situation is that, while discussing each topic, Encyclopedia would often say "The details are on my Nth page", to what the Penguins, after looking at said page, respond "We're children, so we can't read..." After that, the three call upon  an anthropomorphic dog-like TV,  who shows them a video about the topic. A mouse called Suu is also featured.

Pythagora Devices 
 are frequently featured.

Algorithm Exercise 
A corner broadcast since 2002. It stars the duo Itsumo Kokokara. It is algorithm themed, so that the movements that are done side by side are related ("crouching motion" combines with "shaking arms", so that the arms avoid the action, etc.). Usually, the duo does the exercise with special guests, such as NHK announcers, baseball players, sumo wrestlers, etc.

There are also individual versions for each member: the "Yamada version" and the "Kikuchi version".

Algorithm March

Otou-san Switch 
A segment in which a father and his child act out sequences and play games based on any of the Japanese letter sounds.

Other Corners 
 
 Sumo wrestler
 Tea kettle
 Chicks
 
 : A potato shaped like a dice (voiced by Iwao Nozomi) moves forward and backward and to the left and right in the tiles drawn on the ground, with words written on each side of him. He can move even if he is out of the tiles.
  
 : This segment introduces the stages of product testing before the shipment of industrial products.
 Office chairs
 Ballpoint pens
 : Animated shorts about a dog named Framy, who is made out of clear squares. Other characters that are composed of simple figures, but they are not transparent.
 : a critique of Pythagorean Devices by Ms. Hammer Critic (voiced by Mio Ueda), in some segments a dissection of the Pythagora Devices are demonstrated to “how the trick works”.
 Equipment No. 147: 3 Cups
 Equipment No. 175: The Come Back Car
 Equipment No. 144: The Toothpick
 
 : an egg floats on a cup filled with water mixed with salt
 : a pine cone dipped in a glass of water contracts, and when dry it expands back to normal
 : a nori seaweed in a clear package becomes transparent when dipped in a glass of water
 : lifting a salted ice cube with a string
 : pouring water to a cup in front of a paper inscribed  (with the pu mirrored horizontally) reverses that letter's image
 "Mini" segment: whiteboard art on a mirror floats when dipped on a tub of water
 
 : Tsutomu Sekine and Jonio Iwai perform what seems to be physically impossible feats using stop-motion photography.
 : claymation featuring Nendore and Nandore tripping on various objects resulting in impressions:
 TV remote and peanuts
 Colored pencils and a piece of cheese
 Cellophane tape dispenser and magnet
 Bottle opener and clothespin
 Acorns and dice
 Mosquito coil and seashells
 Marbles and shogi pieces
 : A stop-motion animation segment featuring ordinary objects being brought to life.
 , eraser
 , drinking straw
 , rubber band
 , bolt
 , sugar cube
 , sticky note
 , chopsticks
 , shoe brush
 , matchbox
 , aluminum foil
 Also includes  and  segments for some of the above creatures.
 : This segment teaches how to make gadgets and gimmicks included in Pythagora Devices.
 Beginner Course
 Zigzag Sloping Road
 Intermediate Course
 A Winding Road
 Marble Accelerator
 Advanced Course
 
 
 
 : Ten small sticks join together and transform into various things.
 
 Swing bridge (Amanohashidate, Kyoto)
 Bascule bridge (Tei Port Moveable Bridge in Kōnan, Kōchi)
 Lift bridge (Kagasunobashi in Tokushima)
 Transporter bridge (Vizcaya Bridge in Biscay, Spain)
 Submersible bridge (on Corinth Canal in Isthmia, Greece)
 Rolling bascule bridge (Te Matau ā Pohe in Whangarei, New Zealand)
 
 : In a certain place, a start switch is pressed in a machine, which introduces something happening.
 
 : A segment which introduces various robots (mainly work robots).
 Sentry robot
 Bicycle parking
 Automatic milking

 
 : Motion capture animation, in which dots appear one by one, inviting readers to guess what animal is depicted in the initial film.
 An inchworm
 
 
 
 A horse
 Fish bones
 Walking the dog
 : An inlay of dots, as in What Animal is This?, together with motion capture, invites readers to guess what these dots form or person is doing.
 Bullfighting
 Conducting
 
 Tangerines
 Pencils
 Teacups

Actors 

Broadcast 
Outside Japan, NHK World Premium broadcasts PythagoraSwitch Mini. In Brazil, TV Cultura has been broadcasting it under the title Viva Pitágoras! since at least 2006. Starting April 2015, an English version of PythagoraSwitch Mini has been broadcast on NHK World TV. In addition, some PythagoraSwitch videos are also available on Google Video, YouTube and DailyMotion.

Awards 
At the 30th Japan Prize International Educational Program Contest, in 2003, episode 25 "Let's Look at It Another Way" won top prize, the Prime Minister's award, of the Early Education category.
At Prix Jeunesse 2004 in Munich it won top prize in the age 6 and below non-fiction category.

References

External links 

NHK original programming
Television shows featuring puppetry
Japanese children's television series
Children's education television series
2002 Japanese television series debuts
2000s Japanese television series
2010s Japanese television series
2020s Japanese television series